Raúl Borges Requena (4 February 1882 – 24 November 1967) was a Venezuelan pedagogue, guitarist and composer.

Borges is mainly known today for having taught Alirio Díaz, Antonio Lauro, Rodrigo Riéra, and other Venezuelan guitarists. Many of his compositions for guitar were published in Madrid with Union Musical Española, including:
Canción antigua
Canción de cuna in D (also in G)
El Criollito
Fuente morisca
Marisol
Vals Venezolano
Vals sobre motivos franceses

External links 
 Caroni Music - publisher of scores and CDs of South American music
 (Spanish) Raul Borges. Compositions for guitar: Vol 5 / Fundacion Vicente Emilio Sojo
  (Spanish)

1882 births
1967 deaths
Composers for the classical guitar
Male classical composers
People from Caracas
Venezuelan classical guitarists
Male guitarists
Venezuelan composers
20th-century guitarists
20th-century male musicians